Jack Allan may refer to:

Jack Allan (footballer, born 1883) (1883–?), Manchester United footballer
Jack Allan (footballer, born 1886) (1886–1919), Newcastle United footballer
Jack Allan (golfer) (1875–1898), Scottish amateur golfer

See also
Jack Allen (disambiguation)